FR or fr may refer to:

Businesses and organizations
 Frankfurter Rundschau, a German newspaper
 Ryanair (IATA airline code)

Places
 France, by ISO 3166-1 alpha-2 and NATO code
 French language (ISO 639 alpha-2 code "fr")
 Franc, a unit of currency
 .fr, the country code Top Level Domain (Most Important) for France
 Freiburg, Germany (vehicle registration code FR)
 Freistadt, Austria (vehicle registration code FR)
 Frontier Regions, a group of small administrative units in the Federally Administered Tribal Areas, Pakistan
 Province of Frosinone, Italy (ISO 3166-2:IT code FR)
 Canton of Fribourg, Switzerland (ISO 3166-2:CH code FR)

Science and technology

Biology and medicine
 French catheter scale, a scale for medical catheters
 Elias Magnus Fries (1794-1878), Swedish mycologist and botanist; author abbreviation Fr.

Computing
 .fr, the country code Top Level Domain (Most Important) for France
 Fujitsu FR (Fujitsu RISC), a microprocessor
 Product code used by Farbrausch, e.g. fr-019
 Full Rate, a speech coding standard used in GSM
 CSS flex unit

Other uses in science and technology
 Ryan FR Fireball, a mixed-power US Navy fighter aircraft
 Flame retardant
 Flash release, a technique used in wine pressing
 Francium, symbol Fr, a chemical element
 Franklin (unit), unit of electrical charge
 Front-engine, rear-wheel drive layout of an automobile design
 Froude number, in physics

Other uses
 Friday, the 6th day of week
 Father (title), a title for a Catholic clergyman, especially a priest
 Frater (Fr.), in Roman Catholicism, a monk who is not a priest
 Fr., a title by male members of organisations such as AMORC
 Fasch Repertorium, a catalogue of the works of the Baroque composer Johann Friedrich Fasch
 Federal Register, a US government official journal
 Ffestiniog Railway, a tourist attraction in Gwynedd, Wales
 Formula Renault, a racing class
 Formula Regional (disambiguation)
 Franc, a unit of currency
 French language (ISO 639 alpha-2 code "fr")
 Furness Railway, an early British railway company
 Formula Regional, a class of Open-wheel racing

See also

 
 RF (disambiguation)
 F (disambiguation)
 R (disambiguation)